The province of Southeast Sulawesi (Sulawesi Tenggara) in Indonesia is divided into fifteen regencies (kabupaten) and two cities (kota), which together are subdivided in turn administratively into 219 districts (kecamatan).

The districts of Southeast Sulawesi, with the regency or city each falls into, are as follows:

Abeli, Kendari
Abuki, Konawe
Andoolo, Konawe Selatan
Angata, Konawe Selatan
Asera, Konawe
Barangka, Muna
Baruga, Kendari
Batalaiworu, Muna
Batauga, Buton
Batu Atas, Buton
Batu Putih, Kolaka Utara
Baula, Kolaka
Betoambari, Bau-Bau
Binongko, Buton
Binongko, Wakatobi
Bondoala Sampara, Konawe
Bonegunu, Muna
Bungi, Bau-Bau
Duruka Bone, Muna
Gu, Buton
Kabaena Timur, Bombana
Kabaena Timur, Buton
Kabaena, Bombana
Kabaena, Buton
Kabangka, Muna
Kabawo, Muna
Kadatua, Buton
Kaledupa, Buton
Kaledupa, Wakatobi
Kambowa, Muna
Kapontori, Buton
Katobu, Muna
Kendari Barat, Kendari
Kendari, Kendari
Kodeoha, Kolaka Utara
Kokalukuna, Bau-Bau
Kolaka, Kolaka
Kolono, Konawe Selatan
Konda, Konawe Selatan
Kontunaga, Muna
Kulisusu Barat, Muna
Kulisusu Utara, Muna
Kulisusu, Muna
Kusambi, Muna
Ladongi, Kolaka
Lainea, Konawe Selatan
Lakudo, Buton
Lambadia, Kolaka
Lambuya, Konawe
Landono, Konawe Selatan
Laonti, Konawe Selatan
Lasalepa, Muna
Lasalimu Selatan, Buton
Lasalimu, Buton
Lasolo, Konawe
Lasusua, Kolaka Utara
Latambaga, Kolaka
Latoma, Konawe
Lawa, Muna
Lohia, Muna
Maginti, Muna
Maligano, Muna

Mandonga, Kendari
Mawasangka Timur, Buton
Mawasangka, Buton
Moramo, Konawe Selatan
Mowewe, Kolaka
Murhum, Bau-Bau
Napabalano, Muna
Ngapa, Kolaka Utara
Pakue, Kolaka Utara
Palangga, Konawe Selatan
Parigi, Muna
Pasar Wajo, Buton
Pasir Putih, Muna
Poasia, Kendari
Poleang Barat, Bombana
Poleang Timur, Bombana
Poleang Timur, Buton
Poleang, Bombana
Poleang, Buton
Pomalaa, Kolaka
Pondidaha, Konawe
Ranomeeto, Konawe Selatan
Ranteangin, Kolaka Utara
Rarowatu, Bombana
Rarowatu, Buton
Rumbia, Bombana
Rumbia, Buton
Samaturu, Kolaka
Sampolawa, Buton
Sawa, Konawe
Sawerigadi, Muna
Siompu, Buton
Soropia, Konawe
Sorowalio, Bau-Bau
Talaga Raya, Buton
Tanggetada, Kolaka
Tikep, Muna
Tinanggea, Konawe Selatan
Tirawuta, Kolaka
Tiworo Tengah, Muna
Tomia, Buton
Tomia, Wakatobi
Tongauna, Konawe
Tongkuno, Muna
Uepai, Konawe
Uluiwoi, Kolaka
Unaaha, Konawe
Wakorumba Selatan, Muna
Wakorumba, Muna
Wangi-Wangi Selatan, Buton
Wangi-Wangi Selatan, Wakatobi
Wangi-Wangi, Buton
Wangi-Wangi, Wakatobi
Watopute, Muna
Watubangga, Kolaka
Wawonii, Konawe
Waworete, Konawe
Wawotobi, Konawe
Wolio, Bau-Bau
Wolo, Kolaka
Wonggeduku, Konawe
Wundulako, Kolaka

 
South East Sulawesi